Peru is a town in Oxford County, Maine, United States. The population was 1,488 at the 2020 census.

History
It was granted by the Massachusetts General Court to several residents from Falmouth, Maine. The first grantee to settle would be Merrill Knight in 1793. Organized in 1812 as Plantation Number 1 (also Thompsontown), it was incorporated on February 5, 1821, as the 240th town in Maine. Peru was named in the spirit of liberty and solidarity for Peru, the South American country which declared independence from Spain on July 28, 1821.

With dark soil free from stones, farming was an early industry. The chief crop was hay, and raising sheep became a common occupation. In addition, there were five sawmills which manufactured long and short lumber, as well as specialty products like wooden bowls. In 1870, the population was 931.

Formerly possessing an independent public school department, Peru joined Maine School Administrative District 21 in 2006.

Geography
Peru is drained by the Androscoggin River. Worthley Pond, 2 miles long by half a mile wide, is in the southern part of the town.

Demographics

2010 census
As of the census of 2010, there were 1,541 people, 629 households, and 446 families living in the town. The racial makeup of the town was 97.6% White, 0.6% Native American, 0.3% Asian, 0.3% from other races, and 1.1% from two or more races. Hispanic or Latino of any race were 0.3% of the population.

There were 629 households, of which 28.1% had children under the age of 18 living with them, 57.2% were married couples living together, 7.8% had a female householder with no husband present, 5.9% had a male householder with no wife present, and 29.1% were non-families. 22.3% of all households were made up of individuals, and 12% had someone living alone who was 65 years of age or older. The average household size was 2.45 and the average family size was 2.82.

The median age in the town was 47 years. 18.9% of residents were under the age of 18; 8.3% were between the ages of 18 and 24; 20.4% were from 25 to 44; 36.3% were from 45 to 64; and 16.1% were 65 years of age or older. The gender makeup of the town was 49.5% male and 50.5% female.

2000 census
As of the census of 2000, there were 1,515 people, 585 households, and 436 families living in the town. There were 849 housing units at an average density of 18.1 per square mile (7.0/km). The racial makeup of the town was 99.27% White, 0.33% Native American, 0.13% Asian, and 0.26% from two or more races. Hispanic or Latino of any race were 0.40% of the population.

There were 585 households, out of which 35.0% had children under the age of 18 living with them, 63.8% were married couples living together, 5.6% had a female householder with no husband present, and 25.3% were non-families. 19.8% of all households were made up of individuals, and 7.9% had someone living alone who was 65 years of age or older.  The average household size was 2.59 and the average family size was 2.98.

 
In the town, the population was spread out, with 26.7% under the age of 18, 5.8% from 18 to 24, 28.2% from 25 to 44, 24.2% from 45 to 64, and 15.1% who were 65 years of age or older.  The median age was 40 years. For every 100 females, there were 99.9 males.  For every 100 females age 18 and over, there were 99.8 males.

The median income for a household in the town was $38,083, and the median income for a family was $43,047. Males had a median income of $32,171 versus $23,214 for females. The per capita income for the town was $16,383.  About 3.4% of families and 6.0% of the population were below the poverty line, including 3.8% of those under age 18 and 7.0% of those age 65 or over.

Notable people 

 Clinton Briggs Ripley, architect
 Samuel Thurston, first congressional delegate from Oregon Territory

References

External links
 Town of Peru, Maine
 Oxford County Online – Town of Peru
 Worthley Pond Association

Towns in Oxford County, Maine
Towns in Maine